CCL Label Decorative Sleeves is a UK based company founded in 1979. The company manufactures heat shrink sleeves for product marketing sectors including, food, beers, soft drinks, spirits, wines, dairy products, household products, cosmetics, toiletries etc. Shrink sleeves can be applied to varying shapes and in many forms both for branding and security.

History
In 1979 Decorative Sleeves was founded to produce promotional sleeves for application at Mailway Packaging Solutions. The Company was initially located in Witham, Essex. In 1989/1990 the business expanded and leased units in Kings Lynn in Norfolk. The company then moved its operations solely to Norfolk where it remains today. From 1995 to 1996 the print hall was extended and 2 new flexo presses were installed. This was followed by a New 9 colour 'Grafomac' gravure press in 1998.

In 1998 Decorative Sleeves acquired Smurfit Labels a major U.K. competitor. Smurfit Labels previously known as Sanderson & Clayton had been active in gravure print since 1967 and have been manufacturers of shrink sleeves since 1984. In February 2000 the company was acquired again by Illinois Tool Works Inc. of Illinois, USA. Under ITW the wet glue paper label business was sold to S & C Labels in 2001.  ITW started major new investment programme, which included relocating the Wakefield site to Castleford and installation of 10 colour wide web high speed rotogravure printing press, the installation of new 8 colour in-line U.V. flexo printing press in King's Lynn factory and the re-organisation of manufacturing into defined business units.

In 2007 Decorative Sleeves was acquired for a second time by CCL Industries becoming part of their label division.

References 
 CCL Sleeves chosen for new cleaning products www.labelsandlabeling.com Retrieved 2010-09-24.
 Heinz Beanz packaging feels the wind of change www.prw.com Retrieved 2010-10-05
Coca-Cola chooses decorative sleeves for an instant win promotion www.thefreelibrary.com Retrieved 2010-10-19
Sleeves Ensure Energy Drinks Stay On Target www.packagingessentials.com Retrieved 30/06/2010
Jolly Sleeves give impact to Galatea Sailor brand www.globalprintmonitor.com Retrieved 01/11/2010
UK Packaging Awards 2010: Label of the Year www.packagingnews.co.uk Retrieved 04/11/2010
CCL provides sleeve labels for Southern Comfort’s Christmas campaign www.labelsandlabeling.com Retrieved 19/01/2011

External links
 CCL Label official site
 CCL Industries official site
 CCL Container official site

Plastics companies of the United Kingdom